Anania plectilis is a moth in the family Crambidae. It was described by Augustus Radcliffe Grote and Coleman Townsend Robinson in 1867. It is found in North America.

References

Moths described in 1867
Pyraustinae
Moths of North America